Aaron Beamon Martin (born February 10, 1941) is a former American football cornerback in the National Football League for the Los Angeles Rams, the Philadelphia Eagles, and the Washington Redskins. He played college football at North Carolina Central University, where he was inducted into the Alex M. Rivera Athletics Hall of Fame.

References

1941 births
Living people
American football cornerbacks
Los Angeles Rams players
North Carolina Central Eagles football players
Philadelphia Eagles players
Washington Redskins players
Sportspeople from New Bern, North Carolina